USS Sandoval is a name used more than once by the United States Navy:

 , a gunboat commissioned 2 September 1898
 , an attack transport commissioned 7 October 1944

United States Navy ship names